The Pro-Design Effect is an Austrian single-place paraglider that was designed and produced by Pro-Design of Natters in the mid-2000s. It is now out of production.

Design and development
The aircraft was designed as a beginner/intermediate glider.

Variants
Effect 34
Small-sized model for lighter pilots. The glider model is DHV 1 certified.
Effect 36
Mid-sized model for medium-weight pilots. The glider model is DHV 1 certified.
Effect 38
Large-sized model for heavier pilots. The glider model is DHV 1 certified.

Specifications (Effect 36)

References

Effect
Paragliders